Big W was a large format chain of megastores owned by the Kingfisher Group (later Woolworths Group PLC) in United Kingdom, which operated between 1998 and 2004. Big W consisted of Kingfisher's main retail chains that they owned at the time - Comet, B&Q, Superdrug and Woolworths in one store format. Despite sharing the name with the Australian chain of the same name, the two of them are not related, as they were owned by different companies.

Woolworths scrapped the Big W format in 2004 and sold off 1/3 of the stores, while continuing to operate 14 of the stores in a smaller format known as Woolworths Out-of-Town Stores, sometimes sharing the space with Peacocks.

History
In 1967, The F.W. Woolworth Company opened their first British Woolco store in Oadby, Leicestershire. Woolworth later opened 2 more stores in Thornaby, Stockton on Tees and Bournemouth, Hampshire. All the stores were very successful, and eventually, Woolworth operated 12 stores under the Woolco name. When the F.W. Woolworth Company spun off the British Woolworth chain into Woolworth Holdings PLC in 1983, the Woolco stores were later converted to regular Woolworth stores, and then the company sold them off to Supermarket chain Gateway in 1986. Gateway then sold the stores once more, this time to Asda in 1988. Only a few former Woolco stores remain to this day under Asda ownership. 

In 1980, Woolworth acquired the DIY chain B&Q, which at its peak had 26 stores. In 1982, Both the British Woolworth and B&Q chains were split from the F.W. Woolworth Company into Woolworth Holdings PLC. The company expanded by acquiring the Comet Group in 1984 and then Superdrug in 1987. Woolworth Holdings PLC was renamed Kingfisher Group PLC in 1989 to focus less on the Woolworths brand.

In 1998, the CEO of Kingfisher Group, Sir Geoffrey Mulcahy publicly revealed Big W, a chain of stores that would combine Kingfisher's four main brands. This chain was similar to Woolco, and featured products from Woolworths, Superdrug, Comet and B&Q in a single format. In the same year, the Canadian-born Bob Hetherington was chosen to run the chain. Bob had experience with the American F.W. Woolworth Company as he had previously run the American Woolco chain before all the stores were closed in 1982. Hetherington wanted the Big W stores to be fun places to shop in and to offer entertainment during the weekend.

A location in Edinburgh, Scotland was chosen to be the first Big W location. Construction started in September 1998, and the store opened in June 1999, and was a success for the Kingfisher Group. Kingfisher later opened up stores in other locations, such as Stockton, Bristol, Bradford, Glasgow, Norwich, Birmingham, Redruth and Tamworth.

In 2000, clothing and food brands for Big W were created with assistance from The Big Food Group and Peacocks. Only a few stores would supply both of those selections.

Fate
In 2000, Kingfisher Group PLC began to demerge, after losses from the Comet and B&Q chains and the battle of the ownership of French DIY chain Castorama. In 2001, Kingfisher split their General Merchandise division, which included Woolworths, Big W, Music and Video Club and Superdrug into its own company, known as Woolworths Group PLC. Superdrug was later sold to Dutch company Kruidvat in the same year, and eventually Kingfisher began to focus exclusively on DIY after selling off Comet.

The Kingfisher demerger affected the Big W chain, as the stores would simply become oversized Woolworths stores after the loss of the other chains, and was renamed to Woolworths Big W. Despite this, stores continued to open up monthly under the new name, with some existing stores having their logo on the top of the building changed to the modified version. In 2003, Woolworths started to open stores less often as the chain was beginning to become very unprofitable for the company.

Following a period of losses, Woolworths confirmed in 2004 that it would abandon the Big W concept. The group sold seven of the 21 Big W stores in 2005 to Tesco and Asda, which also included a store in Grimsby that never opened due to the Big W format already being scrapped.

The Tamworth store closed in April 2008 so that M&S could expand (They already owned the other half of the former Big W) and the remaining 13 stores closed in 2008 and 2009 after Woolworths ceased trading.

About
Much like Woolco, Big W stores were found on retail parks or out-of-town areas around the UK and supplied goods from the four main Kingfisher brands. When the stores became Woolworths Big W, they supplied only Woolworths products. These remained mainly the same when the stores became regular Woolworths Stores. Peacocks (who supplied Big W's Clothing Brand) shared half of the out-of-town stores with Woolworths. Some stores later introduced Woolworths Clearance Outlets at the back of the stores.

Stores (Incomplete)

Stores converted to Woolworths
Edinburgh, Opened in 1999 and was rebranded as Woolworths/Peacocks in 2005, also containing a Burger King. This was also the first Big W to open in the United Kingdom. After its closure, the building remained vacant and abandoned and was the victim of heavy vandalism until reopening as The Range in 2013.
Glasgow, Opened in 2000 and was rebranded as Woolworths/Peacocks in 2005. It reopened as a Tesco Extra in 2011.  Tesco announced the closure of this store in January 2022 after a dispute with the lessor and its poor financial performance.
Filton, Opened in 2000 and was split up into Woolworths/Peacocks and TJ Hughes stores in 2005. After a long period of the building being empty after the closure of both stores, the entire building was demolished in 2013 to make way for newly built Asda and B&M Bargains stores.
Bradford, Opened in 2000 and was rebranded as Woolworths/Peacocks in 2005. It reopened as The Range in 2010.
Tamworth, Opened in 2000 and was split up into Woolworths and Marks & Spencer stores in 2005. The Woolworths half closed in April 2008 so Marks & Spencer could use the other half to expand their store, which itself opened in December 2008.
Loughbrough, Opened in 2002 and was rebranded as Woolworths in 2005. It reopened as a Tesco in 2010.
Newport, Opened in 2002 and was split into Woolworths and TJ Hughes stores in 2005. The Woolworths half reopened as The Range in 2011 while the TJ Hughes remained empty after its closure until becoming a B&M Home Store in November 2017.
Stockton, Opened in 2000 and rebranded as a Woolworths/Peacocks in 2005.  Store is now split up into a retail park, with stores for The Range, B&M Home Store, Bargain Buys (now empty) and Smyths Toys.
Beckton, Opened in 2002 and became a Woolworths/Peacocks in 2005. The left side of the building was split up into units for Family Bargains (Later 99p Stores and Poundland, currently empty) and Home Bargains, with the remaining half of the store completely vacant with its Woolworths signage completely intact. This half was finally accompanied in 2016, when Selco Builders Warehouse took over the remaining part.
Cheetham Hill, Opened in 2005 and later turned into a Woolworths almost immediately in the same year. The shop is now split up into 4 retail units, featuring stores of B&M Bargains, Currys & PC World, Matalan (Empty as of July 2019) and USC.
Catcliffe, Opened around 2000 and became a Woolworths/Peacocks in 2005. A Specsavers opticians opened in 2008 and later relocated to a new-built unit after Woolworths closed. Building reopened as Boundary Mill Stores in 2012.
Birmingham, Opened in 2000 and rebranded as Woolworths in 2005. Now used as a retail park.
Norwich, Opened in 2002 and rebranded as a Woolworths/Peacocks in 2005, alongside the store being split into other store units for other retailers. The former Woolworths half now trades as a Matalan.

Stores sold to Asda or Tesco in 2004
Coatbridge, Opened 2002, closed 2005, Now Tesco Extra.
Aberdeen, Opened 2003, Closed 2005, now Asda.
Hull, Opened 2003, Closed 2005, Now Asda.
Bolton, Opened 2001, Closed 2005, Now Asda.
Redruth, Opened 2000, Closed 2005, Now Tesco Extra.
Coventry, Opened 2000, Closed 2005, Now Tesco Extra.
Grimsby, Was supposed to open in 2004, it never opened and eventually opened as a Tesco Extra.

A store in Byker was also planned, but instead opened as a  Woolworths/Peacocks store in 2004. This store now operates as an Asda.

References

External links
  (archived)

Retail companies established in 1999
Retail companies disestablished in 2004
1999 establishments in England
2004 disestablishments in England
Defunct supermarkets of the United Kingdom
Hypermarkets
British companies established in 1999
British companies disestablished in 2004